Sotiris Sakellariou (alternate spelling: Sotirios) (born November 13, 1955) is a retired Greek professional basketball player.

Professional career
Sakellariou played club basketball with the Greek club Iraklis, and PAOK. He made his debut in the top level Greek Basket League, in October 1971.

National team career
Sakellariou was a member of the senior men's Greek national basketball team. With Greece's senior men's national team, he had 127 caps, and he scored 566 points (4.5 points per game). With Greece's senior men's team, he played at the EuroBasket 1975, the EuroBasket 1979, and the 1980 European Olympic Qualifying Tournament.	

He won the gold medal at the 1979 Mediterranean Games.

References

External links
FIBA Profile
FIBA Europe Profile
Hellenic Basketball Federation Profile 

1955 births
Living people
Competitors at the 1979 Mediterranean Games
Greek men's basketball players
Iraklis Thessaloniki B.C. players
Mediterranean Games gold medalists for Greece
Mediterranean Games medalists in basketball
P.A.O.K. BC players
Basketball players from Thessaloniki
Point guards